The McClintock Prize for Plant Genetics and Genome Studies is a prize awarded in genetics and genomics.  The Prize is awarded by the Maize Genetics Executive Committee, and is presented to the Prize winner each spring at the Annual Maize Genetics Conference.  

Named in honour of Barbara McClintock the award was founded in 2013 by Jeffrey Bennetzen, and funded by his royalties from the book Handbook of Maize by Bennetzen and Sarah Hake.  McClintock received the Physiology or Medicine Nobel Prize in 1983 for her work on maize genome structure, function and evolution, especially for her discovery and study of mobile DNA elements (aka jumping genes).

Laureates
Laureates of the award include:

2022 Robin Buell, University of Georgia
 2021 John Doebley, University of Wisconsin
 2020 James Birchler, University of Missouri
 2019 Detlef Weigel, Max Planck Institute for Developmental Biology
 2018 Robert A. Martienssen, Cold Spring Harbor Laboratory
 2017 Michael Freeling, University of California, Berkeley 
 2016 Jeffrey D. Palmer, Indiana University Bloomington
 2015 Susan R. Wessler, University of California, Riverside
 2014 David Baulcombe, University of Cambridge

See also

 List of genetics awards

Citations

Awards established in 2013
Academic awards
Genetics awards